Comfort Amwe is a Nigerian female politician from Sanga Local Government Area of Kaduna state. She is representing Sanga constituency in the Kaduna state House of Assembly.

Background 
Amwe obtained an Ordinary National Diploma, (OND), from Plateau state polytechnic in 1983. She was one time adviser to the Kaduna state governor from September 2008 to September 2009.

Political career 
Comfort Amwe was the chairperson of Sanga local government from May 2010 until she contested and won as member, Kaduna state house of assembly. She is a member of the Peoples Democratic Party, (PDP).

References 

Nigerian politicians
Kaduna State
Peoples Democratic Party (Nigeria) politicians
People from Kaduna State